Sooky is a 1931 American pre-Code adventure film directed by Norman Taurog and written by Joseph L. Mankiewicz, Norman Z. McLeod and Sam Mintz. It is a sequel to the 1931 film Skippy. The film stars Jackie Cooper, Robert Coogan, Jackie Searl, Willard Robertson, Enid Bennett and Helen Jerome Eddy. It was released on December 26, 1931, by Paramount Pictures.

Plot

Cast
Jackie Cooper as Skippy Skinner
Robert Coogan as Sooky Wayne
Jackie Searl as Sidney Saunders
Willard Robertson as Dr. Skinner
Enid Bennett as Mrs. Skinner
Helen Jerome Eddy as Mrs. Wayne
Guy Oliver as Mr. Moggs
Harry Beresford as Mr. Willoughby
Gertrude Sutton as Hilda
Oscar Apfel as Krausmyer
Tom Wilson as Officer Duncan

References

External links
 

1931 films
1930s adventure comedy-drama films
American black-and-white films
American adventure comedy-drama films
American sequel films
1930s English-language films
Films about children
Films based on American comics
Films based on comic strips
Films directed by Norman Taurog
Films with screenplays by Joseph L. Mankiewicz
Live-action films based on comics
Paramount Pictures films
1931 comedy films
1931 drama films
1930s American films